The Teichfuss Falco  was an Italian single-seat, intermediate-performance glider, designed by Luigi Teichfuss and flown in 1931.

Design and development
The Falco was designed as a glider with performance better than that of a trainer though not at a soaring competition level.  It was a high-wing monoplane, with its single spar wing braced on each side by a pair of faired struts arranged in a V, joining the lower fuselage to the outer end of the central panel at about one-third span. This central panel was rectangular in plan and without dihedral. The outer panels were straight-tapered to blunt tips, the wing becoming thinner and thus acquiring dihedral though retaining a horizontal upper surface. Ailerons occupied the whole trailing edges of these outer panels; there were no inboard flaps or air brakes.

Its wood-framed, plywood-skinned fuselage was deep-sided and hexagonal in cross section, tapering markedly towards the tail. The wing was mounted on a pedestal which continued only briefly behind the wing. The pilot's open cockpit was immediately ahead of the pedestal and below the wing leading edge.  There was no fixed tailplane; instead the Falco had a single-piece, all-moving elevator with a straight leading edge and a semi-elliptical trailing edge.  There was a small triangular fin which supported a much larger, tall balanced rudder, essentially triangular in shape but with rounded vertices.  Hinged above the elevator trailing edge, which had a cut-out for its movement, the rudder extended down to the keel, where it was protected by a small, faired tail bumper.  There was a long landing skid with rubber shock absorbers, running from near the nose to under the aft end of the wing pedestal.

The Falco first flew in 1931.  Two were built; one was lost in a crash.

Specifications

See also

References

Falco
1930s Italian sailplanes
Aircraft first flown in 1931